Sibyl is a 2019 comedy-drama film directed by Justine Triet and starring Virginie Efira, Adèle Exarchopoulos and Gaspard Ulliel, in his final film to be released theatrically during his lifetime. It was selected to compete for the Palme d'Or at the 2019 Cannes Film Festival.

Synopsis
Sibyl is a psychotherapist who returns to her first passion: writing. Her newest patient, Margot, is a troubled up-and-coming actress, who proves to be too tempting a source of inspiration. Fascinated almost to the point of obsession, Sibyl becomes more and more involved in Margot's tumultuous life.

Cast
 Virginie Efira as Sybil
 Adèle Exarchopoulos as Margot Vasilis
 Gaspard Ulliel as Igor Maleski
 Sandra Hüller as Mikaela "Mika" Sanders
 Laure Calamy as Édith
 Niels Schneider as Gabriel 
 Paul Hamy as Étienne
  as Dr. Katz
 Adrien Bellemare as Daniel
 Jeanne Arra-Bellanger as Selma
 Liv Harari as Livia
 Lorenzo Lefebvre as Galotin
 Aurélien Bellanger as the editor

Production
Filming took place in Paris, in studios located in Lyon and on the Italian island of Stromboli.

Reception
Sibyl received mixed reviews from critics. The site's critical consensus reads, "Intriguing yet uneven, Sibyl is just about held together by its leads, but too often pits great performances against frustrating filmmaking."

References

External links
 
 

2019 films
2019 comedy-drama films
2010s French-language films
Belgian comedy-drama films
Films about actors
Films directed by Justine Triet
Films set in Paris
Films set in Sicily
Films shot in Normandy
Films shot in Paris
Films shot in Sicily
French comedy-drama films
French-language Belgian films
2010s French films